Mowinckel's Second Cabinet governed Norway between 15 February 1928 and 12 May 1931. It had the following composition:

Cabinet members

|}

Secretary to the Council of State

References

General references 
 Johan Mowinckel's Second Government. 15 February 1928 – 12 May 1931. Government.no.

Explanatory notes 

Mowinckel 2
Mowinckel 2
1928 establishments in Norway
1931 disestablishments in Norway
Cabinets established in 1928
Cabinets disestablished in 1931